Stepan Alexandrovich Pachikov (born February 1, 1950) is the co-founder of ParaGraph Intl., Parascript, Evernote Corp. among other software companies which contributed heavily to the development of Handwriting recognition and VRML technologies.

Background and education

Pachikov was born in Oghuz region , in Azerbaijan SSR  the son of Alexander Stepanovich Pachikov and Ekaterina Pankova. Pachikov is half Udi, quarter Ukrainian, and quarter Russian. The word 'pachikov' in the Udi language means "the son of two branches".

He attended Novosibirsk State University, Tbilisi State University (Georgia) and Moscow State University where he received an honorary master's degree in economic applications of mathematical methods. He received his PhD in fuzzy logic from the USSR Academy of Sciences.

Career
In 1989–1997, he worked in Moscow at ParaGraph International, a company which dealt with handwriting recognition software for the Apple Newton. In 1992 he opened the US branch of ParaGraph in Silicon Valley, where he created and distributed software called Calligrapher for handwritten input on tablets and touchscreens. From 1997 to 1998, he served as vice president and established a Pen & Internet division of Silicon Graphics.

Pachikov is a co-founder and board-member of a company that provides optical character recognition (OCR) and handwriting recognition to Lockheed Martin, which packages processing machines for the US Postal Service. In 2008, he founded and became chief architect of the application, services, and vision behind the Evernote line of services. Since 1986, he has been President of the Moscow Computer Children Club, supported at the time by world chess champion Garry Kasparov, where children are taught computer programming, web design, etc.

References

External links

 USA Today - No matter who's in the White House, USA is where it's at for tech firms by Kevin Maney

1950 births
Living people
Russian emigrants to the United States
Udi people
American computer businesspeople
American computer programmers
People from Oghuz District
Russian businesspeople in the United States